Miura 1 (previously called Arion 1) is a suborbital recoverable launch vehicle developed by the Spanish company PLD Space. It is planned to be the first recoverable launch vehicle in Europe.

The first launch is currently scheduled for the second quarter of 2023.

Design
Miura 1 was originally proposed as a two-stage rocket capable of achieving suborbital flight. It was originally planned to be 12 m long, with a capacity of 250 kg (551 lb). The engines were to use liquid oxygen and kerosene as propellants.

In its final design, Miura 1 is a 12.7 m long 0.7 m diameter one-stage rocket, propelled by one TEPREL-B engine. The vehicle can fly a payload of up to 200 kg on a suborbital trajectory. The propulsion system is equipped with actuators to tilt the engine for an active
thrust vector control. In its first mission it will carry 100 kg of payload to an apogee of 153 km. Additionally, Miura 1 is equipped with a recovery system using its engines and parachutes that enable PLD Space to recover the vehicle from the ocean and re-use the complete launch vehicle. With this, it will be the first recoverable launch vehicle in Europe. Miura 1 is intended to be used for scientific research or technology development in a microgravity environment and/or in the upper atmosphere.  Furthermore, about 70% of the technology developed for Miura 1 is planned to be used on the Miura 5 orbital rocket.

In December 2019 GMV announced that the Miura 1 avionics system had passed the qualification phase.

In March 2020, the stress test of the Miura 1 pressurized tanks was carried out to check their ability to withstand the working pressure (more than ) with a successful result. COPVs (Composite Overwrapped Pressure Vessel) are used to pressurize propellant tanks and are a fundamental element of many launchers.

In July 2020 the German Center of Applied Space Technology and Microgravity (ZARM) successfully completed vibration tests of its payload that will fly on the first launch (Test Flight-1) of Miura 1.

On April 7, 2022, the company carried out the first test of the complete launcher at its facilities in Teruel, being the first test in Europe of a rocket propelled by liquid fuel.

Launch schedule
The first test flight of Miura 1 was initially planned for 2021 from an experimental rocket launch site in Huelva, southwestern Spain, called El Arenosillo, and it will carry a payload from the German Center of Applied Space Technology and Microgravity (ZARM). Up to eight suborbital launches are targeted per year. It has been delayed to 2022.

As of March 2023, the first test flight is scheduled to take place in the second quarter of 2023.<ref name="esf-20230313">

See also

References

External links
 Official Miura 1 product website

Space launch vehicles of Spain
Reusable launch systems